John Hewer (13 January 1922 – 16 March 2008) was an English actor and business manager who became familiar with audiences for playing Captain Birdseye in ads for Birds Eye.

Biography 
Hewer was born in Leyton, Essex, the son of an engine driver. He attended Leyton High School following which he worked for the Social Services Department for London County Council (LCC) dealing with people who had problems paying their rent. During World War II when he served as a navigator in the Fleet Air Arm, with which he travelled to Vancouver and the Caribbean and witnessed the result of the Hiroshima bombing. During the war Hewer performed with a group that entertained other service personnel. On being demobbed he returned to working for LCC but feeling drawn to the stage he joined the Unity Theatre and became a stalwart of London's Players' Theatre where he appeared throughout his career including in musical theatrical productions such as Sail Away and Six of One in London's West End theatre. The highlight of his theatrical career was starring opposite Julie Andrews in The Boy Friend on Broadway in the 1950s.

His television work included hosting the 1970s Canadian CTV variety series The Pig and Whistle, but his most familiar role was as the fictitious sailor Captain Birdseye, the mascot for Birds Eye frozen foods in scores of British TV commercials from 1967 to 1998. In a 1993 poll he was voted the most recognised naval captain after Captain Cook.

With the actor Mike Hall he set up Hewer and Hall, the first conference production company in the UK to use the American model of "show business for business". The company presented conferences, product launches, training films and cabarets in the UK and across Europe; it was active in the late 1960s and early 70s and counted IBM, Mobil, Volkswagen, Beechams, Gulf Oil and Birds Eye among its clients.

Hewer married Edna Vernon in 1943, who predeceased him in 1998. Residing in Epping in his later years and finally Brinsworth House in Twickenham, London, Hewer died aged 86 on 16 March 2008. He was survived by a son and daughter.

Selected filmography
 The Dark Man (1951) - 1st Taxi Driver
 Assassin for Hire (1951) - Giuseppe Riccardi
 Law and Disorder (1958) - Foxy
 Operation Stogie (1959)
 Strip Tease Murder (1961) - Bert Black
 Three Spare Wives (1962) - Rupert
 Billy Budd (1962) - Dubbing
 Mister Ten Per Cent (1967) - Townsend
 Birds Eye adverts as Captain Birdseye (1967-1998)
 Home Before Midnight (1979) - Donelly
 Noel's House Party'' (13th March 1993) - Captain Birdseye

References

External links
 
 The Times, 19 March 2008: John Hewer, original Captain Birdseye, dies aged 86
 BBC bio of John Hewer as "Captain Birdseye"
The Guardian, 18 March 2008: Captain Birds Eye actor dies
The Daily Telegraph, 19 March 2008: Captain Birdseye actor John Hewer dies
Obituaries:
The Times, 18 March 2008
The Guardian, 20 March 2008
The Daily Telegraph, 22 March 2008

1922 births
2008 deaths
English television presenters
English male stage actors
English male television actors
People from Leyton
Male actors from London
Fleet Air Arm personnel of World War II